Pristenovsky is a rural locality (a khutor) and the administrative center of Pristenovskoye Rural Settlement, Chernyshkovsky District, Volgograd Oblast, Russia. The population was 281 as of 2010. There are 2 streets.

Geography 
Pristenovsky is located on the bank of the Solonaya River, 68 km southeast of Chernyshkovsky (the district's administrative centre) by road. Vodyanovsky is the nearest rural locality.

References 

Rural localities in Chernyshkovsky District